Ohio Right to Life is an anti-abortion group based in Columbus, Ohio. It was established in 1967 by Jack Willke and his wife, Barbara. Its president is Michael Gonidakis, who Ohio Governor John Kasich appointed to the state medical board in 2012. The organization had drawn criticism from other anti-abortion groups for not supporting six-week abortion bans, which it considers to be too drastic a challenge to Roe v. Wade. Instead, they favor "chipping away" at Roe incrementally, beginning with laws banning abortion after 20 weeks' gestation. Because of its opposition to six-week abortion bans, Willke himself criticized the organization in 2011, saying, "...after nearly 40 years of abortion on demand, it's time to take a bold step forward." In 2017, the organization had attempted to lobby the Ohio state legislature to ban dilation and evacuation, a procedure primarily used for second trimester abortions. The suggested ban would not have made exceptions for rape and incest. The suggested ban would have allowed the procedure in cases where it would save the life of the mother or allowed the procedure for miscarriages.

References

External links

Ohio Right to Life at OpenSecrets.org

Organizations based in Columbus, Ohio
Organizations established in 1967
1967 establishments in Ohio
Anti-abortion organizations in the United States